is a passenger railway station operated by the Takamatsu-Kotohira Electric Railroad in Takamatsu, Kagawa, Japan.  It is operated by the private transportation company Takamatsu-Kotohira Electric Railroad (Kotoden) and is designated station "N07".

Lines
Mizuta Station is a station on the Kotoden Nagao Line and is located 5.8 km from the terminus of the line at Kawaramachi Station and 7.5 kilometers from Takamatsu-Chikkō Station.

Layout
The station consists of one elevated island platform with the station building underneath. The station is unattended.  It is the only elevated station operated by Kotoden.

Adjacent stations

History
Mizuta Station opened as a station on the Takamatsu Electric Tramway on April 30, 1912. On November 1, 1943 it became a station on the Takamatsu Kotohira Electric Railway. Elevation of the tracks was completed in October 2007.

Surrounding area
Takamatsu Municipal Kawazoe Elementary School
 Japan National Route 11 Takamatsu East Bypass (Sanuki Yume Kaido)

Passenger statistics

See also
 List of railway stations in Japan

References

External links

  

Railway stations in Japan opened in 1912
Railway stations in Takamatsu